Rowleys Bay is an unincorporated community located on Lake Michigan in northern Door County, Wisconsin, in the town of Liberty Grove. The community is named after Peter Rowley who settled in the area in 1835.

Gallery

References

Unincorporated communities in Wisconsin
Unincorporated communities in Door County, Wisconsin